Red Shadow, or Akakage, is a Japanese ninja character.

Red Shadow or Red Shadows may also refer to:

Red Shadow (comics), a DC Comics supervillain team
Red Shadow (film), a 2001 film about the hero
The Red Shadows, a 2009 Italian drama film
Red Shadows (Howard book), a 1968 collection of short stories and poetry by Robert E. Howard
Red Shadows (novel) a 2006 novel by Mitchel Scanlon featuring the character Judge Anderson
Red Shadows, a fictional fighting led by Baron Ironblood in the UK Battle Action Force comic books